The FN Model 1910 is a blowback-operated, semi-automatic pistol designed by John Browning and manufactured by Fabrique Nationale of Belgium.

Development

The FN Model 1910, also known as the Browning model 1910, was a departure for Browning. Before, his designs were produced by both FN in Europe and Colt Firearms in the United States. Since Colt did not want to produce it, Browning chose to patent and produce this design in Europe only. Introduced in 1910, this pistol used a novel operating spring location surrounding the barrel.  This location became the standard in such future weapons as the Walther PPK and Russian Makarov.

It incorporated the standard Browning striker-firing mechanism and a grip safety along with a magazine safety and an external safety lever (known as the "triple safety") in a compact package. Offered in both .380 ACP (6-round magazine) and .32 ACP (7-round magazine) calibres, it remained in production until 1983. It is possible to switch calibres by changing only the barrel. However, FN never offered packages containing a single pistol with both calibre barrels.

Variants

A variant of the Model 1910 was known variously as the Model 1922 or 1910/22.  This was a larger model with a longer barrel (113 mm), slide extension, and a longer grip frame to accommodate an extra two rounds.  This model was aimed at military and police contracts and many examples were produced for various agencies. The FN Model 1910 was initially designed for the Kingdom of Serbia. In 1913, a purchase order for 235, Model 1910 semi automatic pistols was made by the Serbian National Army. The purchase was made for the 1st and 2nd Timok infantry divisions of the first army. 

1910/1922 pistols went on to see extensive service in World War Two, and continued to be manufactured by the Germans after their occupation of Belgium and seizure of the FN factory. These examples carry Nazi production stamps, and most have simple chequered wood grips instead of the earlier horn or plastic grips bearing the FN logo.

The FN Model 1922 was also used by the following countries: Yugoslavia (60,000 Automatski pistolj (Brauning) 9mm M.22 between 1923 and 1930), The Netherlands, Greece, Turkey, Romania, France, Finland, Denmark, and West Germany in the  post war period. While the Model 1910 was widely sold on both civilian and military markets, the Model 1922 was considered specifically a military and police pistol, with FN offering it to individual civilians only by special order.

In 1955, the Browning Arms Company introduced the Model 1910 pistol for the American market as the Model 1955. Made in Belgium, this model was virtually identical to the European model except for the markings and grips.  Importation ceased in 1968 due to the passage of stricter gun-control laws in the U.S.

Another version, the Model 1971, featured a longer barrel and slide (similar in length to the Model 1922, but with a one-piece slide), adjustable sights, a finger-rest magazine, and enlarged "target" grips.  These features were intended to comply with the Gun Control Act of 1968 which had halted import of the Model 1955.

The  or Hamada Type Automatic handgun was a semi-automatic pistol developed in 1941 for use by the Empire of Japan during World War II. Developed by Bunji Hamada, the pistol took its basic design from the Model 1910 Browning. Production occurred at the Japanese Firearms Manufacturing Company, with only minor changes made as the war progressed.

Use in Assassinations

An FN M1910, serial number 19074, chambered in .380 ACP was the handgun used by Gavrilo Princip to assassinate Archduke Franz Ferdinand of Austria in Sarajevo on 28 June 1914, the act that precipitated the First World War. Numerous previous sources erroneously cited the FN Model 1900 in .32 calibre as being the weapon Princip used. This has led to confusion over the calibre of the pistol actually used.

Paul Doumer, President of France, was assassinated by Russian emigre Paul Gorguloff on 6 May 1932 with a Model 1910 in .32 ACP. The pistol is now in the Musée des Collections Historiques de la Préfecture de Police. 

A Model 1910 was also allegedly used to assassinate Huey Long, governor of Louisiana, on 5 September 1935. Physician Carl Weiss, the alleged assassin, bought the FN M1910 now on display Old State Capitol in Baton Rouge, in Europe for $25 in 1930.

Hannie Schaft used a model M1922 during her assassinations as part of the Dutch communist resistance against Nazi occupation of the Netherlands.

Users 

 
 
      
 
 : In February of 1940  2,500 M/1910 and 2,500 M/1910-22 pistols were bought from Belgium and used in the Continuation War
 :1910/22 model produced at FN after the fall of Belgium
 
 
 :Purchased by some officers

Conflicts 
World War I

Chaco War

World War II

Depictions in Media
James Bond in the 1962 film Doctor No shoots Professor Dent with a FN M1910 instead of the Walther PPK he had been issued at the beginning of the movie. The FN M1910 was substituted for the Walther as Bond used a silencer on the pistol and the production did not have a silencer that could fit the PPK.

Notes

References

 Modern Firearms - Handguns - Browning 1910, 1922 and 380
 Vojta, Jira T. in AutoMag, Volume XXXII, Issue 10, January 2000, pp. 231–233.
 Henrotin, Gerard - FN Browning pistols 1910 & 1922 - HLebooks.com, 2006.
 Unblinking Eye - FN Model 1910

External links
Voorschrift Pistool F.N. Kal. 9 m.m. en 7.65 m.m. (Dutch manual for the FN (Fabrique Nationale) Modèle 1922 and the FN M1906 (M1905) Vest pocket pistol)
FN pistol model 1910 (infographic tech. drawing)

Early semi-automatic pistols
Model 1910
Semi-automatic pistols of Belgium
Simple blowback firearms
Weapons and ammunition introduced in 1910
.32 ACP semi-automatic pistols
.380 ACP semi-automatic pistols